Isaac "Taffy" Spelman (9 March 1914 – after 1946) was an English professional footballer who played for Usworth Colliery, Leeds United, Southend United, Tottenham Hotspur, Hartlepool United.

Football career 
Spelman began his career at Usworth Colliery before joining Leeds United in 1933. The right half signed for Southend United in May, 1935, he made a total of 50 appearances and scored three goals in all competitions for the Shrimpers. Spelman was transferred to Tottenham Hotspur in May, 1937  and went on to feature in a further 32 matches and scored two goals in all competitions for the Lilywhites. After World War II Spelman joined Hartlepool in 1946 and played in 25 games.

References 

1914 births
Year of death missing
Footballers from Newcastle upon Tyne
English footballers
Association football wing halves
Usworth Colliery A.F.C. players
Leeds United F.C. players
Southend United F.C. players
Tottenham Hotspur F.C. players
Hartlepool United F.C. players
English Football League players